The 2003–04 Sunshine Tour was the fourth season of professional golf tournaments since the southern Africa based Sunshine Tour was rebranded in 2000.  The Sunshine Tour represents the highest level of competition for male professional golfers in the region.

There were 17 tournaments on the schedule. This was an increase of one from the previous year.  There were three tournaments from the previous season that were eliminated: the Dimension Data Better-Ball tournament, the Vodacom Golf Classic, and the Vodacom Players Championship.  Three new tournaments were added: the Canon Classic (played in 2003 only), the Devondale Championship (played in 2003 only), and the Parmalat Classic. The tour was based predominantly in South Africa, with 13 of the 17 tournaments being held in the country. Two events were held in Swaziland, and one event each was held in Botswana and Zambia.  Two events, the Dunhill Championship and the South African Airways Open were co-sanctioned by the European Tour.

As usual, the tour consisted of two distinct parts, commonly referred to as the "Summer Swing" and "Winter Swing". Tournaments held during the Summer Swing generally had much higher prize funds, attracted stronger fields, and were the only tournaments on the tour to carry world ranking points.

The Order of Merit was won by Darren Fichardt.

Schedule 
The following table lists official events during the 2003–04 season.

Order of Merit 
The Order of Merit was based on prize money won during the season, calculated in South African rand.

Notes

References

External links 

Sunshine Tour
Sunshine Tour
Sunshine Tour